Davide DiRuscio (born May 5, 1992) is a  professional lacrosse player for the Buffalo Bandits of the National Lacrosse League. Undrafted, DiRuscio signed with the Bandits for the 2015 NLL season. Outside of the NLL, DiRuscio has  played for the St. Catharines Saints, Coquitlam Adanacs, Peterborough Lakers, and the Niagara Lock Monsters. With the Lock Monsters in 2014, DiRuscio was named MVP and Top Goaltender of the Canadian Lacrosse League DiRuscio made his NLL debut with the Bandits in relief of Anthony Cosmo on January 31, 2015, and won his first career start on February 28 against the Colorado Mammoth.

References

External links
NLL stats at pointstreak.com
Bio for the Buffalo Bandits

Canadian lacrosse players
Buffalo Bandits players
Sportspeople from Oakville, Ontario
1992 births
Living people